The 1997 AC Delco 400 was the 30th stock car race of the 1997 NASCAR Winston Cup Series and the 23rd iteration of the event. The race was originally scheduled to be held on Sunday, October 26, 1997, but was postponed to Monday, October 27, due to rain. The race was held in Rockingham, North Carolina, at North Carolina Speedway, a  permanent high-banked racetrack. The race took the scheduled 393 laps to complete. In the final laps of the race, Petty Enterprises driver Bobby Hamilton would manage to make a late-race charge to lead to take his second career NASCAR Winston Cup Series victory and his only victory of the season. To fill out the top three, Robert Yates Racing driver Dale Jarrett and Hendrick Motorsports driver Ricky Craven would finish second and third, respectively.

Background 

North Carolina Speedway was opened as a flat, one-mile oval on October 31, 1965. In 1969, the track was extensively reconfigured to a high-banked, D-shaped oval just over one mile in length. In 1997, North Carolina Motor Speedway merged with Penske Motorsports, and was renamed North Carolina Speedway. Shortly thereafter, the infield was reconfigured, and competition on the infield road course, mostly by the SCCA, was discontinued. Currently, the track is home to the Fast Track High Performance Driving School.

Entry list 

 (R) denotes rookie driver.

Qualifying 
Qualifying was split into two rounds. The first round was held on Friday, October 24, at 2:00 PM EST. Each driver would have one lap to set a time. During the first round, the top 25 drivers in the round would be guaranteed a starting spot in the race. If a driver was not able to guarantee a spot in the first round, they had the option to scrub their time from the first round and try and run a faster lap time in a second round qualifying run, held on Saturday, October 25, at 9:45 AM EST. As with the first round, each driver would have one lap to set a time. Positions 26-38 would be decided on time, and depending on who needed it, the 39th thru either the 42nd, 43rd, or 44th position would be based on provisionals. Four spots are awarded by the use of provisionals based on owner's points. The fifth is awarded to a past champion who has not otherwise qualified for the race. If no past champion needs the provisional, the field would be limited to 42 cars. If a champion needed it, the field would expand to 43 cars. If the race was a companion race with the NASCAR Winston West Series, four spots would be determined by NASCAR Winston Cup Series provisionals, while the final two spots would be given to teams in the Winston West Series, leaving the field at 44 cars.

Four drivers would fail to qualify: Brett Bodine, Dave Marcis, Ed Berrier, and Kenny Irwin Jr.

Full qualifying results 

*Time not available.

Race results

References 

1997 NASCAR Winston Cup Series
NASCAR races at Rockingham Speedway
October 1997 sports events in the United States
1997 in sports in North Carolina